Hans Schwarz (16 September 1912 – 9 December 1996) was a German swimmer. He competed in the men's 100 metre backstroke at the 1936 Summer Olympics.

References

External links
 

1912 births
1996 deaths
German male swimmers
Olympic swimmers of Germany
Swimmers at the 1936 Summer Olympics
People from Weißenfels
Male backstroke swimmers
Sportspeople from Saxony-Anhalt
20th-century German people